Francis Michael Horne (18 October 1905 – 18 September 1958) was an Australian rules footballer who played with Richmond and Hawthorn in the Victorian Football League (VFL).

Notes

External links 

1905 births
1958 deaths
Australian rules footballers from Victoria (Australia)
Richmond Football Club players
Hawthorn Football Club players